The Museum of Funeral Customs was located at 1440 Monument Ave. in Springfield, Illinois, US. It featured exhibits dealing with American funerary and mourning customs. The museum was near Oak Ridge Cemetery, the site of Abraham Lincoln's tomb.  Collections at the museum included a re-created 1920s embalming room, coffins and funeral paraphernalia from various cultures and times, examples of post-mortem photography, and a scale model of Lincoln's funeral train.  The museum hosted tours and special events and provided resources to scholars who are researching funeral customs. A gift shop provided books and funeral-related gifts, including coffin-shaped keychains and chocolates.  The museum was closed in March 2009 due to poor attendance and handling of the museum's trust fund. The contents of the collection were transferred to the Kibbe Hancock Heritage Museum in Carthage, Illinois, in February 2011.

The home of the former museum reopened in March 2016 as the Springfield and Central Illinois African-American History Museum, a museum of the black heritage of central Illinois.

References

Death customs
Defunct museums in Illinois
Museums disestablished in 2009
2009 disestablishments in Illinois